Trymalium odoratissimum is a plant species found in Southwest Australia.

Taxonomy
This description was published in 1838 by John Lindley in Edwards Botanical Register, who notes that Robert Mangles, of the colony's Mangles family, provided a flowering specimen to a horticultural society in London. 

Two subspecies are recognised:

Trymalium odoratissimum Lindl. subsp. odoratissimum. The nominate predominantly occurs on the Swan Coastal Plain and is found to the north of Perth. 
Trymalium odoratissimum subsp. trifidum (Rye) Kellermann, Rye & K.R.Thiele. A subspecies emerging from a revision published in 2008. The well known description Trymalium floribundum Steud. is currently regarded as a synonym of this subspecific concept. It bears the common name karri hazel and is known as djop born in the Nyungar language.

References

Endemic flora of Western Australia
Rhamnaceae